SF: The Year's Greatest Science Fiction and Fantasy is a 1956 anthology of science fiction and fantasy short stories edited by Judith Merril.  It was the first in a series of 12 annual anthologies edited by Merrill.  Most of the stories originally appeared in the magazines Astounding, Fantasy and Science Fiction, Galaxy Science Fiction, Fantastic Universe, Science-Fantasy, If, Good Housekeeping and Bluebook.

Contents

 Introduction, by Orson Welles
 Preface, by Judith Merril
 "The Stutterer", by R. R. Merliss
 "The Golem", by Avram Davidson
 "Junior", by Robert Abernathy
 "The Cave of Night", by James E. Gunn
 "The Hoofer", by Walter M. Miller, Jr.
 "Bulkhead", by Theodore Sturgeon
 "Sense from Thought Divide", by Mark Clifton
 "Pottage", by Zenna Henderson
 "Nobody Bothers Gus", by Algis Budrys
 "The Last Day of Summer", by E. C. Tubb
 "One Ordinary Day, with Peanuts", by Shirley Jackson
 "The Ethicators", by Willard Marsh
 "Birds Can’t Count", by Mildred Clingerman
 "Of Missing Persons", by Jack Finney
 "Dreaming Is a Private Thing", by Isaac Asimov
 "The Country of the Kind", by Damon Knight
 "The Public Hating", by Steve Allen
 "Home There’s No Returning", by Henry Kuttner & C. L. Moore
 "The Year’s S-F, Summation and Honorable Mentions", by Judith Merril

References

1956 anthologies
Science fiction anthology series

Fantasy anthologies
Gnome Press books